Deepspot is a  deep swimming pool and scuba diving training center, located near Warsaw in Mszczonów, Poland. It held the record for being the deepest swimming pool in the world until June 2021, when the  Deep Dive Dubai was opened.

Deepspot is designed as a practice and training site for divers with varying levels of experience who wish to develop additional diving skills.

The facility and pool have numerous special features to facilitate training, including a simulated blue hole going down to the deepest point in the pool, artificial underwater caves and archaeological ruins for training in overhead environments, and a small simulated shipwreck. There is an underwater observation tunnel for spectators, and a hotel adjoining the pool with underwater rooms at 5 meters depth and viewing areas are under construction.

The facility is mainly intended for Recreational diving and professional training; however, Deepspot also offers training to police, fire, medical, and military personnel needing proficiency in technical and professional diving disciplines.

It is owned by Michal Braszczynski who also owns FlySpot, in Warsaw, Poland. At Deepspot's opening it became the world's deepest swimming pool, exceeding Y-40 Deep Joy in Montegrotto Terme, Italy and Nemo 33 in Brussels, Belgium. 

Deepspot is now known as the world's second deepest swimming pool, after Deep Dive Dubai in the United Arab Emirates.

See also
 World Recreational Scuba Training Council
 Blue Abyss
 Nemo 33
 Y-40 pool

Notes

References

External links
 
 Deepspot photo gallery. Design Boom magazine.
 World's deepest diving pool opens in Poland. AFP News Agency (Video).
 The world's deepest diving pool. BBC News (Video).

Swimming pools
2020 establishments in Poland
Underwater diving sites in Poland
Underwater diving training organizations

